JIPPO is a Finnish football club, based in Joensuu. It plays in the Kakkonen, the third highest level of Finnish football. Jippo plays its home matches at Mehtimäki, Joensuu.

JIPPO was formed in 2001 after the merger of JiiPee and Ratanat – both playing in the Kakkonen (third level), the division JIPPO played its first four seasons from 2002 to 2005. The team was promoted to Ykkönen for the season 2006 after winning the eastern group of Kakkonen and beating Klubi-04 2–1 on aggregate in the promotion playoff. Arpad Mester scored the winner goal. After 9 years of playing in Ykkönen, Jippo relegated back to Kakkonen for the season 2015, winning promotion back to Ykkönen after the 2020 season.

External links
Official website

Joensuu
Football clubs in Finland
Association football clubs established in 2001
2001 establishments in Finland